In geometry, the sphinx tiling is a tessellation of the plane using the "sphinx", a pentagonal hexiamond formed by gluing six equilateral triangles together. The resultant shape is named for its reminiscence to the Great Sphinx at Giza. A sphinx can be dissected into any square number of copies of itself, some of them mirror images, and repeating this process leads to a non-periodic tiling of the plane. The sphinx is therefore a rep-tile (a self-replicating tessellation). It is one of few known pentagonal rep-tiles and is the only known pentagonal rep-tile whose sub-copies are equal in size.

See also
 Mosaic

References

External links
 Mathematics Centre Sphinx Album ... 

Pentagonal tilings
Aperiodic tilings
Sphinxes